Robin Miller has been a TV personality, food writer and nutritionist since 1990 and she is the author of ten books, including Robin Takes 5 and the New York Times bestseller, Quick Fix Meals. Her popular show, Quick Fix Meals with Robin Miller, aired on Food Network for 5 years. She currently lives in Scottsdale, AZ with her two sons.

Publication work
Robin's regular food cover story appears in the Arizona Republic (circulation 300,000), USA Today Food, and on the Gannett wire service to more than 144 newspapers nationwide. Her column, Robin’s Rescue, and associated videos can also be found on AZCentral. Robin's recipes and nutrition articles are featured regularly in many newspapers and magazines, including Health, Cooking Light, Parade, Spry Living, American Profile, Shape, Woman’s Day, Woman’s World, and Clean Eating. 

Robin was a contributor to Cooking Light and her work has appeared in other health and fitness publications. She has also provided dieting health tips and nutritional information to organizations such as the American Heart Association and American Institute for Cancer Research.

Television
Robin's new show, Real Life Cooking, launched on NBC Universal-owned Bluprint in January 2018. But - this isn't your mother's cooking show! Robin co-hosts the show with her friend Katie Workman and together they tackle real life cooking challenges and kitchen conundrums we all face every day. In each episode, they dish up delicious, simple recipes, offer time-saving tricks and techniques, share quite a few confessions, and have a LOT of laughs along the way.

The theme of Miller's cooking show Quick Fix Meals with Robin Miller is to provide strategies on how to prepare "stress-free" meals. The strategies provided are tips to help viewers to prepare healthy meals with the least amount of effort required.

Robin has been a guest on hundreds of local and national television and radio programs. She has hosted home videos (for Jane Fonda), cable television vignettes (for Food Network and a variety of international food companies), satellite media tours (a few each year), and spoken at media events in various markets nationwide. She has been a spokesperson for many renowned companies, such as Unilever (working with many brands, including Ragu), S.E. Johnson (Ziploc), Tyson, Sanofi (Auvi-Q, an epinephrine injector for folks with life-threatening food allergies), California Almonds, Health magazine, Family Circle magazine, and many others. Robin has always delivered her message points with clarity and ease, which explains why many clients are repeat clients.

Currently, Robin appears on local, network and cable television. Programs and networks of particular interest include: Bravo, CBS This Morning, The Today Show, Good Morning America, CNN, Fox News Channel, Food Network, Discovery Channel, Better TV, Hallmark's Home & Family, and HGTV.

Bibliography
Robin Takes 5 for Busy Families, Andrews McMeel, August 2013
Robin Takes 5, Andrews McMeel, 2011
Robin Rescues Dinner, Potter, 2009
Robin to the Rescue, Taunton, 2008
Quick Fix Meals, Taunton, 2007
Picnics, Potter, 2005
Verdure, Potter, 2001
The Newlywed Cookbook, Sourcebooks, 1991, 1999, and 2013
The Daily Soup, Hyperion, 1999Jane Fonda, Cooking for Healthy Living (1996).
Jane Fonda, Cooking for Healthy Living, Turner, 1996      J

External links
 Robin Miller from FoodNetwork.com
 Biography page at FoodNetwork.com (retrieved 18 December 2017)
 https://robinmillercooks.com/

1964 births
American food writers
American television chefs
American male chefs
Food Network chefs
Living people
Writers from Scottsdale, Arizona
American women chefs
21st-century American women